Lightwood Reservoir is an empty reservoir near the town of Buxton, Derbyshire, and associated wildlife reserve. Formerly operated by Severn Trent Water, the land is now owned by Nestlé and is the source of their Pure Life bottled water.

References 

Reservoirs in Derbyshire